Sajjad Hussain Turi is a Pakistani politician who is currently a member of Senate of Pakistan.

Political career

He was elected to the Senate of Pakistan as an independent candidate in 2015 Pakistani Senate election.

References

Living people
Pakistani senators (14th Parliament)
Year of birth missing (living people)